Huronic was part of a fleet of passenger vessels built for service on the Great Lakes (and namely in Collingwood area). She was designed by Hugh Calderwood, Manager of Collingwood Shipbuilding. She was retired in late 1949, a few months after her sister ship, had a catastrophic fire, at her moorings, in Toronto, Ontario, killing 119 of her passengers. She was launched, in Collingwood, Ontario, in 1901.

Huronic ran aground in 1913, off Whitefish Point, in Lake Superior. There was no loss of life, although many other vessels that ran aground during the same storm did lose lives.

Huronic ran aground again in 1928, and was then refloated, off Isle Royale, in Lake Superior.

References

External links

 https://www.greatlakesvesselhistory.com/histories-by-name/h/huronic

Passenger ships of Canada
1901 ships
Steamships of Canada
Great Lakes ships
Canada Steamship Lines
Ships built in Collingwood, Ontario